Jens Marklof FRS is a German mathematician working in the areas of quantum chaos, dynamical systems, equidistribution, modular forms and number theory. He will be president of the London Mathematical Society in the period 2023-2024.

Marklof is currently professor of mathematical physics at the University of Bristol, UK.

Education
After studying physics at the University of Hamburg, Marklof was awarded a doctorate in 1997 at the University of Ulm.

Awards and honours
In June 2010, Marklof was awarded the Whitehead Prize by the London Mathematical Society for his work on quantum chaos, random matrices and number theory. Marklof was elected a Fellow of the Royal Society (FRS) in 2015.

Publications

References 

Academics of the University of Bristol
Living people
20th-century German mathematicians
Whitehead Prize winners
University of Hamburg alumni
University of Ulm alumni
Fellows of the Royal Society
Year of birth missing (living people)
21st-century German mathematicians